Cochylimorpha subwoliniana is a species of moth of the family Tortricidae. It is found in Romania, Russia and Central Asia (Dshungarskij Ala Tau, Zailijskij Ala Tau, Issyk, Ketman).

The wingspan is 11–14 mm. Adults have been recorded on wing from May to July.

References

Moths described in 1962
Cochylimorpha
Moths of Europe
Moths of Asia